"My Heart Beats Like a Drum (Dum Dum Dum)", originally released and also known as "My Heart Beats Like a Drum (Dam Dam Dam)", is the second single by German Eurodance group ATC from their debut album Planet Pop. While not as successful as "Around the World (La La La La La)", it was still a Top 10 hit in several countries across Europe.

Background 
"My Heart Beats Like a Drum" was released after the peak success of "Around the World (La La La La La)". The song had included the same producers of Alex Christensen and Peter Könemann, hence the similar melody to "Around the World (La La La La La)". It was first available mainly in Europe on 2 September 2000, and had multiple Top 40 peaks across the continent. Despite the single's moderate success, it never surpassed the peak positions of "Around The World (La La La La La)" in any country.

The single was first released with the title "My Heart Beats Like a Drum (Dam Dam Dam)", but all future releases were dubbed "My Heart Beats Like a Drum (Dum Dum Dum)".

Music video 
A music video for the song was released on the same day as the audio release. It features the four original singers, Tracey, Joey, Sarah and Livio in a room with red, blue, green, walls, and windows, the latter of which has a zebra print on one side with a purple ceiling. The members of ATC are seen mostly dancing in gold shining clothes. Every time the "Dum Dum Dum" hook is sung, the members first raise their arms above their heads, then lower them to their torso, and finally lower them to their thighs. The scenes without the choreography show two of the singers walking on the ceilings (done via rotating the camera upside down), with the last minute of the video having all four band members dance upside down on the purple ceiling.

Track listings 
CD single
 "My Heart Beats Like a Drum (Dam Dam Dam)" (Radio Edit)
 "My Heart Beats Like a Drum (Dam Dam Dam)" (Extended Club Mix)
German CD maxi-single
 "My Heart Beats Like a Drum" (Radio Edit)
 "My Heart Beats Like a Drum" (Extended Club Mix)
 "My Heart Beats Like a Drum" (Rüegsegger#wittwer Clubremix)
 "My Heart Beats Like a Drum" (Triple X Extended Remix)
 "My Heart Beats Like a Drum" (Rüegsegger#wittwer Frantic Remix)
 "My Heart Beats Like a Drum" (Triple X Dub Attack)

Charts

Weekly charts

Year-end charts

References

2000 singles
2000 songs
A Touch of Class (band) songs
Song recordings produced by Alex Christensen
Songs written by Alex Christensen